All-Union Committee of Physical Culture and Sports Tournament was a single season official tournament among the stronger Class A teams of masters, held in 1952 under the aegis Football Federation of the Soviet Union. The tournament consisted of two stages: preliminary and final. Preliminary stage was played in the second half of April in four groups (Kiev, Tbilisi, Baku and Kharkiv) in one round. Two best teams from each group went to Final stage in Moscow in May-June 1952. The winner of the tournament was CDSA Moscow.

Results

Preliminary stage

Kharkiv 
??.04.1952 Krylia Sovetov Kuybyshev - MVO Kalinin 2-0

20.04.1952 Dynamo Moscow - Torpedo Moscow 2-1

??.04.1952 Krylia Sovetov Kuybyshev - Torpedo Moscow 3-2

24.04.1952 Dynamo Moscow - MVO Kalinin 2-1

??.04.1952 Torpedo Moscow - MVO Kalinin 0-1

28.04.1952 Krylia Sovetov Kuybyshev - Dynamo Moscow 1-0

Kiev 
??.04.1952 Dynamo Kiev - Dynamo Leningrad 1-1

18.04.1952 CDSA Moscow - Lokomotiv Moscow 3-0

??.04.1952 Dynamo Kiev - Lokomotiv Moscow 2-1

23.04.1952 Dynamo Leningrad - CDSA Moscow 2-0

??.04.1952 Lokomotiv Moscow - Dynamo Leningrad 1-2

27.04.1952 Dynamo Kiev - CDSA Moscow 0-2

Baku 
??.04.1952 Shakhtyor Stalino - Dinamo Minsk 0-1

19.04.1952 Spartak Moscow - Daugava Riga  2-0

??.04.1952 Shakhtyor Stalino - Daugava Riga 1-0

24.04.1952 Dinamo Minsk - Spartak Moscow 0-0

??.04.1952 Dinamo Minsk - Daugava Riga 2-1

27.04.1952 Spartak Moscow - Shakhtyor Stalino 3-1

Tbilisi 
14.04.1952 Dynamo Tbilisi - Zenit Leningrad 0-2

21.04.1952 Dynamo Tbilisi - VVS Moscow 1-3

27.04.1952 VVS Moscow - Zenit Leningrad 2-1

Final stage

Moscow 
08.05.1952 CDSA Moscow - Dynamo Moscow 2-1

10.05.1952 VVS Moscow - Spartak Moscow 2-2

13.05.1952 Dynamo Moscow - Dinamo Minsk 4-0

16.05.1952 Spartak Moscow - Krylia Sovetov Kuybyshev 1-1

20.05.1952 CDSA Moscow - Zenit Leningrad 0-0

21.05.1952 Dynamo Moscow - VVS Moscow 1-0

25.05.1952 Dynamo Leningrad - Spartak Moscow 1-1

29.05.1952 CDSA Moscow - Krylia Sovetov Kuybyshev 1-2

30.05.1952 Dynamo Moscow - Spartak Moscow 2-2

03.06.1952 CDSA Moscow - Dinamo Minsk 2-1

08.06.1952 Zenit Leningrad - Spartak Moscow 4-3

10.06.1952 CDSA Moscow - Dynamo Leningrad 1-0

13.06.1952 Spartak Moscow - Dinamo Minsk 4-1

17.06.1952 CDSA Moscow - VVS Moscow 1-1

17.06.1952 Dynamo Leningrad - Dynamo Moscow 3-2

25.06.1952 CDSA Moscow - Spartak Moscow 4-2

26.07.1952 Dynamo Moscow - Krylia Sovetov Kuybyshev 3-2

??.??.1952 Krylia Sovetov Kuybyshev - Dynamo Leningrad 2-1

??.??.1952 Krylia Sovetov Kuybyshev - Dinamo Minsk 4-2

??.??.1952 Krylia Sovetov Kuybyshev - Zenit Leningrad 1-1

??.??.1952 Krylia Sovetov Kuybyshev - VVS Moscow 1-3

??.??.1952 Dynamo Leningrad - Dinamo Minsk 1-0

??.??.1952 Dynamo Leningrad - Zenit Leningrad 3-3

??.??.1952 Dynamo Leningrad - VVS Moscow 1-1

??.??.1952 Zenit Leningrad - Dinamo Minsk 3-0

??.??.1952 Zenit Leningrad - VVS Moscow 0-1

??.??.1952 Dinamo Minsk - VVS Moscow 1-3

??.??.1952 Dynamo Moscow - Zenit Leningrad (canceled)

References 
 footballfacts.ru
 sport-express.ru

1952 in association football
Soviet Union
1952 establishments in the Soviet Union
1952 disestablishments in the Soviet Union